Nyingchi Mainling Airport  is an airport in Mainling, Nyingchi, Tibet Autonomous Region, China. It is suggested to be one of the most challenging instrument approaches in the world, since the airport is in a winding valley.

Nyingchi Airport is the third airport that Tibet has put into operation. Built at a cost of 780 million yuan (96.18 million U.S. dollars), including investment by the General Administration of Civil Aviation of China (CAAC), the airport is 2,949 meters above sea level, lower than the other two civil airports, with a designed annual passenger flow of 120,000.

Known as one of the world's most difficult airports for aircraft to reach, Nyingchi Airport is situated in the valley of the Yarlung Tsangpo River in the Southeast of Qinghai-Tibet Plateau, surrounded by over- mountains enveloped by clouds and fog throughout the year. Aircraft have to fly through the narrow and winding river valley to approach the airport. The narrowest flight path is less than 4 km from one mountain ridge along the valley to the opposite one. According to meteorological data, there are just 100 days overall with suitable weather to operate to the airport each year.

The first landing of a commercial aircraft was made by an Air China Boeing 757 without passengers on July 12, 2006. Six weeks later the first commercial flight with passengers was made to the airport. The airport uses a required navigation performance (RNP) approach procedure to provide instrument approach guidance through surrounding valleys to the vicinity of the runway threshold.

Airlines and destinations

See also
List of airports in China

References

Airports in the Tibet Autonomous Region
Airports established in 2006